Anshun is a prefecture-level city located in southwestern Guizhou province, southwest China, near the Huangguoshu Waterfall, the tallest in China. As of the 2010 census, it had a population of 2,297,339. The city proper had a population of 765,313. Within the prefecture are attractions such as The Long Gong Dragon Caves and the Getu River.

History 
During the Warring States Period, the area belonged to the independent kingdom of Yelang. The Records of the Grand Historian states that of all the independent kingdoms in the area, Yelang was the largest. The kingdom was located along Zangke River (now called Beipan River), and Nanpan River. Bamboo Worship, Cow Totems, bullfights and dogfights were the culture traditions of the Yelang Empire. From 28 BCE to 25 BCE, an insurrection against Emperor Cheng called for the reinstatement of the Yelang Kingdom, but was crushed by Han forces.

In the Three Kingdoms Period, the area was split between the county of Yelang and the county of  within Yi Province.

Under the Jin Dynasty, the area of present-day Anshun would fall under the jurisdiction of Guangtan County within Yi Province.

During the Sui Dynasty, the area belonged to Binhua County, located within Zangke Commandery, .

The area would remain under the Puning Commandery until 1292, when, under the Yuan Dynasty, the area would fall under , which it would remain under until 1372.

 was established during the early Ming Dynasty to govern the region, and would remain until 1602, when it was replaced by the Anshun Military and Civil Administration. The area was incorporated into the Qing Dynasty in 1658, and a new  was established. In April 1638, Xu Xiake, the greatest travel writer and geographer of ancient China, traveled to Anshun.

In 1673, the area became engulfed under the Revolt of the Three Feudatories, during which, significant fighting took place in Anshun.

The Anshun Prefecture would remain until January 15, 1913, when the Republic of China revoked the prefecture system. After a short-lived implementation of a county to govern Anshun, the city was placed under , until reverting to the county system.

In 1950,  was established, governing 6 county-level divisions. In 1958, Anshun County was upgraded to serve as a county-level city. In 1970, Anshun Prefecture was re-organized as Anshun Area, which it would remain until June 23, 2000, when it was re-organized as a prefecture-level city.

Geography and climate 

Anshun's administrative area spans latitude 25° 21′−26° 38′ N and longitude 105° 13′−106° 34′ E and contains sizeable areas of karst formation. It borders Guiyang, the provincial capital, and Qiannan Buyei and Miao Autonomous Prefecture to the east, Liupanshui to the west, Qianxinan Buyei and Miao Autonomous Prefecture to the south, and Bijie to the north.

Anshun has a monsoon-influenced humid subtropical climate (Köppen Cwa) bordering on a subtropical highland climate (Köppen Cwb), tempered by its rather high altitude and having frequent rain (falling on just over half of the days of the year) and high humidity year-round. Winters are short, cool and damp, while summers are very warm. Over two-thirds of the annual rainfall occurs from May to August.

Administrative divisions 
Anshun administers one district, two counties, and three autonomous counties. In addition, there are two other administrative areas:
the Anshun Economic Development Zone
and the national-level Huangguoshu Scenic Area.

Economy 
As of 2019, the city's GDP totaled 92.394 billion Yuan, an increase of 8.1% from 2018. 17.0% of the city's GDP came from the primary sector, 31.7% from the secondary sector, and 51.3% from the tertiary sector.

Major agricultural products grown in Anshun include rice, yams, maize, rapeseed, watermelons, and various vegetables. The city is also home to a sizable animal husbandry industry, which produces mostly pork, but also significant amounts of beef, poultry, and mutton.

Anshun's industry produces both consumer goods and intermediate goods. Major consumer goods produced in the city include detergent, various paper products, liquors, Chinese traditional medicine, and mobile phones. Major intermediate goods produced in the city include construction materials such as stone and cement, raw aluminium, barium salt, and rolling bearings.

In recent years, the city has played an important role in the development of military aircraft, with significant production taking place in the city, and with Anshun Huangguoshu Airport serving as a testing ground for new military aircraft. In 2019, the city government announced an initiative to further increase the city's aerospace industry over the next few years.

Demographics 

According to the Sixth National Population Census of the People's Republic of China conducted in 2010, the residence population was 2,297,339, a reduction of 34,402 (1.48%) from the Fifth Census in 2000. The male-female ratio was 107.34 males per 100 females. Persons aged 0–14 numbered 580,910 (25.29%), 15–64 numbered 1,516,977 (66.03%), and 65+ numbered at 199,452 (8.68%). The urban population was 690,138 (only 30.04%).

Ethnic groups 
Among the residence population, there were 1,466,833 people of Han ethnicity (63.85%), with members of various other ethnic groups taking up the other 36.15%.

Tunpo People 
The city is home to a significant number of Tunpo People, many of whom live in Tianlong Tunbao town.

Transportation 
Anshun West railway station serves as a stop on the Shanghai–Kunming high-speed railway, as well as one of two terminals on the Anshun–Liupanshui intercity railway. 

Anshun Huangguoshu Airport is located in the city. The airport is a dual-use facilities, offering civilian as well as military air services. The airport's destinations include Chongqing, Guangzhou and Beijing's Daxing Airport. Most travelers choose to use Guiyang Longdongbao International Airport and take a coach between there and Anshun.

The G60 Shanghai–Kunming Expressway and National Highway 320 both run through Anshun.

Education 
Anshun Normal University is the largest local institution of higher education, hosting Peace Corps Volunteer TEFL teachers since 2005.

Famous sites 

Tourist attractions and landmarks in Anshun include:

Anshun Wenmiao: This Ming Dynasty Confucian temple, situated within Anshun city, is erected to honor the famous philosopher Confucius and his disciples.
Huangguoshu Waterfall ("Yellow Fruit Tree Waterfall"): A waterfall that can be viewed from all angles, even from inside the waterfall. It is the biggest waterfall in Asia.
Getu River : the river is situated in a mountainous karst area. Along the river one can find Miao villages and karst caves. It is possible to walk 2000 steps up to the Chuangshang cave where one can get a view of the whole area.
Longgong Cave ("Dragon Palace"): The cave is situated above sea level and one has to walk 200 meters upwards to reach it. From there one can sail into the cave and experience the stalagmites and stalactites of the karst formation. There is also a waterfall by the foot of the cave.
The name Tunbao refers to the places where the troops were stationed to guard the frontiers after putting down the riots during their southern expedition to Guizhou in the Hongwu reign (1368–1398) of the Ming Dynasty. The citizens have stuck to their traditional customs since then. The locals still wear clothes from the Ming Dynasty and the houses are also from that era.
Tiantai Mountain: The mountain lies in Tunbao tourist site. It has a history of approximately 421 years. It is the only one ancient architectural complex in Guizhou Province which is the imitation of Song-Dynasty-style. The architectural complex is called The Epic of Stone Architectural. Ming general Wu Sangui once resided here.
Zhongdong (Middle Cave): Twenty families live inside this isolated village, set in a humongous limestone cavern  up a mountain. It's thought to be the only year-round settlement inside a naturally occurring cave in China.
Huajiang Canyon: The only canyon which is famous as the "earth surface crack" canyon. Cliffside inscriptions are in the canyon.

Folk art 
Anshun Batiks are a traditional folk Chinese handicraft art of Buyi Minority. 
People use wax pen to draw various patterns on white cloth such as flowers, birds and some strange shapes. Then, the cloth will be dipped dyeing in the indigotin. Finally, the patterns will be white shapes on a blue ground. Baktis can be used to make dresses and some other daily used things.

Dixi Opera is called the "living fossil of Chinese Opera". The acting style is singing and dancing. The main feature is that all actors wear the xylographic masks and sing the opera which are the ancient style.

References 

 
Cities in Guizhou
Prefecture-level divisions of Guizhou